Giovanni Baratta (1670–1747) was an Italian sculptor of the Baroque period. Born in Carrara, but active in Florence and Livorno. He was a pupil of Giovanni Battista Foggini. He has sculptures in Church of S. Ferdinando in Livorno. He is the nephew of Francisco Baratta the elder, who worked in the studio of Bernini in Rome. Giovanni had two brothers who were also sculptors: Francesco Baratta the Younger and Pietro.

References

Two Early Documented Works by Francesco Baratta the Younger, Marilyn Dunn. The Burlington Magazine (1991) pages 91–94.

1670 births
1747 deaths
People from Carrara
Italian Baroque sculptors
Italian male sculptors